The boys' 400 metre freestyle event at the 2018 Summer Youth Olympics took place on 7 October at the Natatorium in Buenos Aires, Argentina.

Results

Heats
The heats were started at 10:00.

Final

The final was held at 18:00.

References

 

Swimming at the 2018 Summer Youth Olympics